The Wildeshausen Geest is part of the northwest Germany's geest ridge, that begins near Meppen on the river Ems with the Hümmling, is broken by the Weser depression, continues with the Osterholz Geest and reaches the marshes of Kehdingen by the river Elbe with the ridges of the Wingst and Stade Geest. It gives its name to the eponymous nature park.

Landscape 

The term geest is a substantivisation of the Low German adjective , which means "dry and infertile". It is an Old Drift landscape, characterised by the sandy depositions of the Ice Age. In the depressions between them are wet meadows and, where drainage is poor, bogs.

The geest plateaux lie mainly at an elevation of 50 to 60 metres above sea level, but reach elevations even as high as 80 metres in the southeast Nienburg, an area which is outside the Nature Park itself. The striking eastern edge of the geest rises between Hoya and Syke about 40 metres above the Weser Lowlands, west of Syke the land is still about 20 to 30 metres high. On the southern perimeter there is a height difference of 20 metres in places, but often no difference at all.

The larger waterbodies of the Wildeshausen Geest flow from south to north. Apart from the Hunte coming from the Wiehen Hills, they are rivers that rise in the geest itself, especially the Delme, Klosterbach and Hache. The valleys of these small rivers given the landscape a characteristic division and rolling nature. On the northern edge of the geest between Ganderkesee and  they bend towards the east. Small streams on the eastern rim of the geest gather themselves into the northwards-flowing lowland rivers such as the Süstedter Bach.
The present pattern of land use forms a mosaic of woods, arable fields and grassland, which in places is separated by hedges. The woods are partly mixed, partly coniferous. The proportion of woodland is highest in the Wardenburg–Twistringen–Syke triangle, which includes the towns of Wildeshausen and Harpstedt.

See also 
 List of nature parks in Germany
Route of Megalithic Culture - tourist route from Osnabrück to Oldenburg via some 33 Megalithic sites, several in the Wildeshausen area

References

Sources 
 Hans Huntemann: . Oldenburg, 1981.
 Helga Klöver:  Bremen 2000.
  Harald Witt: . Bremen, 2003.
 Nils Aschenbeck and Rüdiger Lubricht (photos): . Oldenburg, 2000.
 Ernst Andreas Friedrich: . Hanover, 1980.

External links 

 Wildeshausen Geest Nature Park
 Tourism
 History
 The Wildeshausen Geest Nature Park at the Weser-Ems culture portal
 Long barrows and passage graves in the Wildeshausen Geest at the Weser-Ems culture portal

Geest
Geography of Oldenburg
Nature parks in Lower Saxony
Regions of Lower Saxony